Bose: Dead/Alive is an  Indian historical drama streaming television miniseries based on the 2012 book India's Biggest Cover-up by activist Anuj Dhar that was released on ALTBalaji on 20 November 2017 IST. The show stars Rajkummar Rao portrays the titular protagonist, based on the life of Netaji Subhas Chandra Bose, with supporting roles including Naveen Kasturia as Darbari Lal, Edward Sonnenblick as Stanley Allen, and Anna Ador as Emilie Schenkl.

Premise
On 18 August 1945 after his overloaded Japanese plane crashed in Japanese-occupied Formosa (now Taiwan) Netaji Subhas Chandra Bose (Rajkumar Rao) is presumed dead. However his family in Kolkata receive a telegram from Mahatma Gandhi to not conduct his last rites. It then begins with speculation about his death and other characters who suggest how he has vanished in the past as well, with all of them suggesting his possible return.

Cast

Rajkummar Rao as Netaji Subhas Chandra Bose
Naveen Kasturia as Darbari Lal
Edward Sonnenblick as Stanley Allen, IG Calcutta Police
 Anna Ador as Emilie Schenkl
 Alexx O'Nell as David Anderson
 Chinmoy Das as Sarat Chandra Bose, elder brother of Subhas Chandra Bose
 Nondini Chatterjee as Bhibhavati Devi
 Abhijit Lahiri as Janakinath Bose, father of Subhas Chandra Bose
 Praveena Deshpandey as Prabhavati Devi, mother of Subhas Chandra Bose
 Manoj Mehra as Hemanta Kumar Sarkar
 Patralekha Paul as Nandani
 Surendra Rajan as Mahatma Gandhi
 Sanjay Gurbaxani as Jawaharlal Nehru
 Mariusz Daszczynski as Adolf Hitler
 Akash Sinha as Habib ur Rahman
 Agnelo Chang as Nakamura
 Sanjay Nath as Dr. Mathur
 Sunil Kumar Palwal as Hayat Khan
 Victoria Ansell Gauvin as Lydia
 Andy von Eich as Prince of Wales
Mir Sarwar as Rehmat Khan / Bhagat Ram Talwar

Episodes
 Episode 1: Dead Or Alive
 Episode 2: Bane of the British Raj
 Episode 3: Catch me if you can
 Episode 4: The Japanese Connection
 Episode 5: The Gold Traile
 Episode 6: Hide And Seek
 Episode 7: Lost And Found
 Episode 8: Escape To Afghanistan
 Episode 9: The End Game

Awards

References

External links 
Bose Deas/Alive at ALTBalaji

 

Hindi-language web series
ALTBalaji original programming
Indian National Army in fiction
Indian drama web series
Cultural depictions of prime ministers of India
British India in fiction
Cultural depictions of Adolf Hitler
Cultural depictions of Mahatma Gandhi
Cultural depictions of Jawaharlal Nehru
Television shows based on Indian novels
Television series about conspiracy theories
Conspiracy theories in India